The Combat of Padrões de Teixeira took place at the end of June 1808, during the First French Invasion of Portugal. The revolt against the French forces started in June 1808. Junot ordered General Loison to march on to Porto, with 1800 soldiers from Almeida.

Combat
On the 21 June, Loison crossed the Douro river. In the mountainous regions of northern Portugal, Francisco da Silveira assembled a force of numerous peasants ready to fight the French force. The combat inflicted considerable losses to the French force, Portuguese losses are unknown.

Aftermath
After the combat, Loison decided to retreat to Almeida. He met resistance again at Castro Daire, between Lamego and Viseu, which ended with 400 dead and wounded on both sides.
The next combat was the Battle of Évora (1808).

References

External links

Battles involving France
Battles involving Portugal
Battles of the Napoleonic Wars
Battles of the Peninsular War
Conflicts in 1808
1808 in Portugal